Xyleborinus andrewesi, is a species of weevil widely distributed throughout the Old World tropics and introduced to many New World countries.

Distribution
It is native to Kenya, Seychelles, Zambia, Bangladesh, Myanmar, China, Japan, India, Indonesia, Malaysia, Nepal, Philippines, Sri Lanka, Taiwan, Thailand, Vietnam, New Guinea, Micronesia, and Papua New Guinea. It is found as an introduced species from Hawaii, Cuba, Jamaica, and United States.

Description
This small, elongate-cylindrical beetle is about 2mm long. Body dark red-dish-brown in color. Elytra sub-acuminate. There are rows of many strong, acuminate tubercles found on the first and third interstriae.

A polyphagous species, it has been recorded from 59 host plants belong to 29 families.

Host plants
 Albizzia
 Anacardium
 Annona squamosa
 Araucaria cunninghamii
 Artocarpus dadah
 Breonia (syn. Anthocephalus)
 Buchenavia
 Canarium
 Cinnamomum
 Cryptocarya
 Garuga
 Isonandra
 Mallotus 
 Mangifera indica 
 Myristica indica
 Odina wodier
 Palaquium eliptica
 Pterospermum
 Randia
 Samanea saman
 Shorea
 Tectona grandis

References 

Curculionidae
Insects of Sri Lanka
Beetles described in 1896